Mandy Kimmons is an American politician. She was a member of the South Carolina House of Representatives from the 97th District, serving from 2018 until 2021. She is a member of the Republican party.

On 22 December 2021, Kimmons announced her resignation for the House of Representatives in order to focus on her legal practice and service to her community.

References

Living people
1984 births
Republican Party members of the South Carolina House of Representatives
21st-century American politicians
University of South Carolina alumni

Women state legislators in South Carolina